The Nyangbo-Tafi language is spoken in the Volta Region of Ghana. It is considered one of the Ghana–Togo Mountain languages of the Kwa family.

It consists of two distinct varieties which Ethnologue treats as separate languages, Nyangbo (Tutrugbu) and Tafi (Tegbo). The differences are reported to be only phonological but people without prior contact have only 67% intelligibility with the other variety.

References

Sources

Languages of Ghana
Ghana–Togo Mountain languages